Lower Myanmar (also called Lower Burma) is a geographic region of Myanmar and includes the low-lying Irrawaddy Delta (Ayeyarwady, Bago and Yangon Regions), as well as coastal regions of the country (Rakhine and Mon States and Tanintharyi Region).

In the Burmese language, people originating from Upper Myanmar are typically called a-nya-tha for men and a-nya-thu for women, whereas those from Lower Myanmar are called auk tha for men and auk thu for women.

Historically, Lower Myanmar referred to the part of Myanmar annexed by the British Empire after the end of the Second Anglo-Burmese War in 1852, plus the former kingdom of Arakan and the territory of Tenasserim which the British had taken control of in 1826 through the Treaty of Yandabo. Lower Myanmar was centred at Rangoon, and composed of all of the coast of modern Myanmar, and also the lower basin of the Irrawaddy River, including Prome. Until the early 19th century, Lower Myanmar was predominantly populated by the Mon and Karen tribes and was a historical stronghold of the Mon people.
Regions of Myanmar

References

History of Myanmar
+